This is a list of the number-one hits of 2007 on FIMI's Italian Singles, Download, and Albums Charts.

Singles and downloads

Albums

See also
2007 in music
List of number-one hits in Italy

External links
FIMI archives
ItalianCharts.com

Number-one hits
Italy
2007

it:Lista dei singoli al numero uno in Italia